Innerpartysystem is the self-titled debut and only studio album by the electronic rock band Innerpartysystem. The album features two tracks from Innerpartysystem's self-recorded The Download EP, "Don't Stop" and "Heart of Fire", which have been re-recorded and mastered. The album was originally scheduled to be released September 10, 2008 (with an early rough date for June 17) but was pushed back to September 29–30. Rocksound magazine (October 2008) said the band were a mix of industrial-pop and dance music.

Track listing
All tracks composed by Innerpartysystem

Personnel
Innerpartysystem
Patrick Nissley - programming, vocals, keyboards
Kris Barman - programming, keyboards, guitar, additional vocals on 1, 5, 7, 9
Jared Piccone - drums, additional vocals on 1, 3, 6, 9
Jesse Cronan - keyboards, programming, additional vocals on 1, 4, 9, 10

Bonus tracks 
Bonus tracks are available through most online digital music stores via download. "Night Is Alive" first appeared on the band's EP.

Bonus UK / Best Buy DVD
A bonus DVD is available with the UK version of the album. This DVD is also available with some Best Buy store versions of the album.  All the videos on the DVD can be found on the band's official YouTube channel. The DVD contains:

Die Tonight Live Forever Video
Don't Stop Video
An American Band In London
Southern California
Spring Break / SXSW
Talking Berks County
Innerpartysystem of Mohnton

Release history

References

External links
Official Website

2008 debut albums
Innerpartysystem albums
Albums produced by Spike Stent
Albums produced by Alan Moulder
Albums produced by Stuart Price
Island Records albums